Kahurabad or Kehurabad may refer to:
 Kahurabad, Anbarabad
 Kahurabad, Jiroft
 Kahurabad, alternate name of Moradabad, Jiroft
 Kahurabad-e Chahchupan-e Do, Kahnuj County
 Kahurabad-e Sohrabi, Kahnuj County